

Curt Rudolf Theodor Badinski (17 May 1890  – 27 February 1966) was a German general in the Wehrmacht during World War II who held several divisional commands. He was a recipient of the Knight's Cross of the Iron Cross of Nazi Germany. Badinski surrendered to the American forces in August 1944 in the Falaise Pocket.

Awards 

 Knight's Cross of the Iron Cross on  11 October 1941 as Oberst and commander of Infanterie-Regiment 489

Works 
 Aus großer Zeit. Erinnerungsblätter des Jäger-Feld-Bataillons Nr.9. Weltkrieg 1914–1918. Bd. 1, Lauenburgischer Heimatverlag, Ratzeburg 1932.
 Aus großer Zeit. Erinnerungsblätter des Jäger-Feld-Bataillons Nr.9. Weltkrieg 1914–1918. Bd. 2, Lauenburgischer Heimatverlag, Ratzeburg 1933.

References

Citations

Bibliography

 

1890 births
1966 deaths
People from Grebenstein
Lieutenant generals of the German Army (Wehrmacht)
German Army personnel of World War I
Recipients of the clasp to the Iron Cross, 1st class
Recipients of the Knight's Cross of the Iron Cross
German prisoners of war in World War II held by the United States
People from Hesse-Nassau
Military personnel from Hesse